On the morning of 1 March 2019, Taliban gunmen and suicide bombers attacked Camp Shorabak in Helmand Province, Afghanistan. They killed 23 Afghan soldiers and injured another 15. Twenty insurgents were killed. None of the US Marine advisers stationed at the military base were injured.

The attack 
The attack took place in the early hours of the morning. 

Taliban fighters stormed the ANDSF [Afghan National Defence and Security Forces] base at Camp Shorabak in Helmand, southern Afghanistan, which is home to the Afghan army's 215th Corps and includes a US garrison of a few hundred Marine advisers. The base was of particular importance to the US military because it had previously hosted thousands of marines deployed to Helmand during the troop surge. During the attack, the Taliban, wearing Afghan military uniforms and using military equipment regularly used by the Afghan army, fooled the soldiers defending the base.

One suicide bomber detonated his explosive device in a canteen. A total of three suicide bombers were killed in the attack. Afghan units were assisted by US forces with air support to repel the Taliban attack.

Claim of Responsibility 
The Taliban immediately claimed responsibility for the attack, their second against a major military target since the start of Taliban-US peace talks, probably to strengthen their negotiating position.

References 

2019 mass shootings in Asia
2019 murders in Afghanistan
21st century in Helmand Province
21st-century mass murder in Afghanistan
Attacks on buildings and structures in Afghanistan 
Attacks on military installations in the 2010s
Islamic terrorist incidents in 2019
March 2019 crimes in Asia
March 2019 events in Afghanistan
Mass shootings in Afghanistan
Suicide bombings in 2019
Suicide bombings in Afghanistan
Taliban bombings
Terrorist incidents in Afghanistan in 2019
Building bombings in Afghanistan
Attacks in Afghanistan in 2019